is the eleventh single of the Morning Musume subgroup Minimoni. It was released on November 19, 2003 and sold 16,410 copies, reaching number 22 on the Oricon Charts.

This was Minimoni's third single under the alias Minihams, a shared double A-side with Natsumi Abe, who performs the second track as Purin-chan.  Like the Minihams, Purin-chan is a hamster character in the anime Hamtaro's third movie.

Track listing 
All songs written and composed by Tsunku.
 
 
 Performed by Natsumi Abe as Purin-chan.
 "Mirakururun Grand Purin! (Original Karaoke)"
 "Pi~hyara Kouta (Original Karaoke)"

Members at the time of single

External links 
 Mirakururun Grand Purin!/Pi~hyara Kouta entry on the Up-Front Works website

Zetima Records singles
Minimoni songs
2003 singles
Songs written by Tsunku
Song recordings produced by Tsunku
Japanese-language songs
Japanese film songs
Songs written for animated films